Orthodox Celts is a Serbian  band formed in Belgrade in 1992 which plays Irish folk music combined with rock elements. Despite their uncharacteristic genre in their home country, the band is one of the top acts of the Serbian rock scene and has influenced several younger Serbian bands, most notably Irish Stew of Sindidun and Tir na n'Og.

The band started their career performing traditional Irish songs and, gradually, introduced more and more of their own material (lyrics mostly written by the band's frontman Aleksandar "Aca Celtic" Petrović, music mostly written by band's violinist Ana Đokić). All their lyrics are in English, but the group has composed some purely instrumental songs as well. The band traditionally celebrates St. Patrick's Day with a large concert in Belgrade. The band also traditionally performs on the Belgrade Beer Fest, and is the only act that has appeared on every Belgrade Beer Fest so far (except Belgrade Beer Fest 2004, when a part of the program was cancelled due to technical problems).

Band history

1990s
During the mid-1980s, Dušan Živanović, drummer of the pub rock band Roze Poze (Pink Poses), wanted to form a band which would perform cover versions of Irish folk songs. Even though he had partially managed to fulfill this idea through some of the songs recorded by Roze Poze, in 1992 he took up playing the accordion and, with Ana Đokić (violin) and Dejan Lalić (mandolin, banjo, tin whistles), formed a band which performed occasionally at clubs. The band had their first official public appearance on Saint Patrick's day in 1992, at the British Council. At the end of the following year, vocalist Aleksandar Petrović, also known as Aca Celtic, joined the band and they started performing more often. The band had their first performance with Petrović on 9 November 1993 in Belgrade Youth Center. Soon the band was joined by Vladan Jovković on guitar and Dejan Jevtović on bass.

The band released their debut self-titled album in 1994, featuring cover versions of twelve Irish folk songs. Among the covers appeared the songs "The Wild Rover", "The Irish Rover", "Weela Weela Walya", "All For Me Grog", "Poor Old Dicey Riley", football chant "A Grand Old Team", and others. The album featured Viktorija Jevtić on vocals, Sava Đustibek on guitar, Predrag Guculj on bass guitar and Lusila Gluščević on flute. The band presented the album on a series of concerts, mainly in Belgrade's Club of Technical Sciences Students. The band also had acoustic sets in chamber arrangement. At the same time, the band started writing their own songs, keeping up with the existing musical style. On September 15, 1995, at Synagogue in Novi Sad, they held a performance with the band Pachamama, which performed Latin American music. The recording of the concert was released on the split live album Muzičke paralele (Musical Parallels) in 1996.

For the next album, The Celts Strike Again, the band, beside the cover versions of traditional songs, included two of their own songs, "Drinking Song" and "Blue". As guests on the album appeared actress Ana Sofrenović who did vocals on the track "Loch Lomond", vocalist of the band Vampiri Aleksandar Eraković, who did backing vocals, member of the band Stočari Branko Vitas, who played banjo, Pachamama member Miljan Mihaljčić, who played khene and thin whistle, and Renesansa member Žorž Grujić, who played zurla and Serbian bagpipes. Three promotional videos were recorded for the album, for "Drinking Song", "Star Of The County Down" and the title track. In 1997, the band, with jazz and world music singer Madame Piano, recorded the song "Galija" ("Galley"), which was released on her album Predeli (Landscapes). At the time, the band presented their new member, Dejan Popin (tin whistles), and started working on their new release. In September 1998, the band represented FR Yugoslavia on the GEA ethnic music festival in Salonica.

Green Roses, released in 1999, featured sixteen songs, half of which were covers of traditional songs, and the other half their original songs. The album was produced by Aleksandar Radosavljević, and as guests appeared Dragoljub Marković (keyboards), Aleksandar Eraković (keyboards) and Goran Stojković (backing vocals). Promotional videos were recorded for the tracks "Rocky Road to Dublin / Down The River", "Merry Sisters", "Far Away", and the title track. In 2000, the band performed across Serbia on the protest rallies against the regime of Slobodan Milošević.

2000s
In 2001, Metropolis Records re-released Orthodox Celts debut album on CD, and as bonus tracks appeared the songs from the live album Muzičke paralele. The following year, the band released their fourth studio album, A Moment Like the Longest Day. The album featured songs written by Đokić (who also sang lead vocals on "Can You Get Me Out?"), Petrović, new bass guitarist Dejan Grujić (formerly of Čutura i Oblaci and Ruž) and Colette Ioanniduoi. The album featured only one traditional cover, "Humors Of Scariff". Block Out leader Nikola Vranjković produced the album, and the band moved to a more rock-oriented sound than on the previous releases. Promotional video was recorded only for the title track. In 2002, Orthodox Celts performed on the Exit festival alongside Shane MacGowan, and Petrović appeared on the stage with MacGowan performing "The Irish Rover" with him.

In 2007, the band released their fifth studio album, One, Two... Five, through Automatik records. The album, produced by Nikola Vranjković, brought eleven songs, two of which are covers of traditional songs, and one of them being a cover of the Thin Lizzy song "Sarah". Unlike the band's previous releases, for which most of the band's songs were composed by Ana Đokić, songs for One, Two... Five were composed mostly by Dejan Lalić. In 2009, Đokić left Orthodox Celts, and was replaced by Nikola Stanojević.

2010s
In the early 2010s, Bojan Petrović, leader of the Celtic rock band Irish Stew of Sindidun, joined Orthodox Celts, playing whistles and singing backing vocals, continuing to front his own band. In March 2012, the band held their traditional Saint Patrick's Day's day tour, including two 20th anniversary celebration concerts at the Students' Cultural Centre in Belgarade, one being an unplugged set for a limited number of visitors, and the other a standard tour set. On July 12, 2013, the band performed on the Music in the Park Stage on the 47th Montreux Jazz Festival. In May 2016, Bojan Petrović left Orthodox Celts and in June 2016 Dragan Gnjatović came to his place.

On January 13, 2017, the band released their latest studio album, Many Mouths Shut!, previously announced by singles "Save Me", released in March 2014, and "One / Milk & Honey", released in March 2015. The album featured seven songs authored by the band and six covers of traditional Irish songs. It was produced by Dejan Lalić and released through the band's own label, O'Celts Records. The album artwork was designed by Italian comic book artist Walter Venturi. In 2018, the band performed in Ireland for the first time, in the club Fibber Magees in Dublin. In June 2020, the band, in cooperation with the Gvint brewery, launched their own brand of beer, Orthodox Celts Irish Red Lager.

Legacy
In 2021 the band's album Green Roses was polled 57th and the album A Moment Like the Longest Day was polled 91st on the list of 100 Best Serbian Albums Since the Breakup of SFR Yugoslavia. The list was published in the book Kako (ni)je propao rokenrol u Srbiji (How Rock 'n' Roll in Serbia (Didn't) Came to an End).

Members

Current members
Aleksandar Petrović - vocals (1993–present)
Dejan Lalić - octave mandola, mandolin, banjo, backing vocals (1992–present)
Nikola Stanojević - violin (2009–present)
Vladan Jovković - acoustic guitars, backing vocals (1993–present)
Dejan Grujić - bass guitar, backing vocals (2001–present)
Dušan Živanović - drums, bodhran (1992–present)
Dragan Gnjatović - tin whistles (2016–present)

Past members
Ana Đokić - violin (1992–2009)
Dejan Jevtović - bass guitar (1993–2001)
Dejan Popin - tin whistles (1997–2012)
Bojan Petrović - tin whistles (2012–2016)

Discography

Studio albums 
Orthodox Celts (1994)
The Celts Strike Again (1997)
Green Roses (1999)
A Moment Like the Longest Day (2002)
One, Two... Five (2007)
Many Mouths Shut! (2017)

Live albums 
Muzičke paralele (split live album, with Pachamama; 1996)

Other appearances 
"Galija" (with Madame Piano; Predeli, 1997)

References

External links
 
 Orthodox Celts at Discogs

Serbian rock music groups
Celtic music groups
Celtic rock groups
Musical groups from Belgrade
Musical groups established in 1992